Dame Mary Anne Salmond  (née Thorpe; born 16 November 1945) is a New Zealand anthropologist, environmentalist and writer. She was New Zealander of the Year in 2013. In 2020, she was appointed to the Order of New Zealand, the highest honour in New Zealand's royal honours system.

Early life and family
Born in Wellington in 1945, Mary Anne Thorpe was raised in Gisborne, before being sent to board at Solway College in Masterton, where she was dux in 1961. In 1962 and 1963, she attended Cleveland Heights High School in the US as an American Field Service scholar.

Salmond then attended the University of Auckland, graduating Master of Arts in anthropology in 1968, and the University of Pennsylvania, where she gained a PhD in 1972. Her thesis was titled Hui – a study of Maori ceremonial gatherings.

Salmond was inspired to research early Māori history during her time in the United States as a teenager. When asked to talk about New Zealand, she realised she did not know much about the Māori side of the story. Her links with the Māori world go back to her great-grandfather, James McDonald, a noted photographer, film-maker and artist who worked with Māori leaders including Sir Āpirana Ngata and Sir Peter Buck.

Salmond married conservation architect Jeremy Salmond in 1971. They had three children, including anthropologist Amiria Salmond, and lived in Auckland until Jeremy Salmond's death on 3 January 2023.

Career
In 2001, Salmond became Distinguished Professor of Māori Studies and Anthropology at the University of Auckland. From 2002 to 2007, Salmond served on the boards of the Foundation for Research, Science and Technology, the Museum of New Zealand, and she was chair of the New Zealand Historic Places Trust. She was Pro-Vice-Chancellor (Equal Opportunity) at the University of Auckland from 1997 to 2006. She is the project sponsor for the Starpath Partnership for Excellence, which aims to ensure that Māori, Pacific and low-income students achieve their potential through education.

She had a close relationship with Eruera Stirling and Amiria Stirling, noted elders of Te Whānau-ā-Apanui and Ngāti Porou. Their collaboration led to three books about Māori life:
 Hui: A Study of Maori Ceremonial Gatherings (1975) – awarded the Elsdon Best memorial gold medal for distinction in Māori ethnology in 1976. In his review of the book, American anthropologist Thomas Fitzgerald noted: "Hui is a theoretical work, being in the tradition of emic anthropology, sociolinguistics, and the situational analysis of Erving Goffman ... [and] ... relies on these theoretical guidelines to achieve its seemingly simple, free-flowing, novel-like quality."
 Amiria: The Life of a Maori Woman – winner of a Wattie Book of the Year Award in 1977.
 Eruera: Teachings of a Maori Elder – first prize in the Wattie Book of the Year Awards in 1981.

Salmond's work then turned to cross-cultural encounters in New Zealand, resulting in two works, which, according to Encyclopedia Britannica, challenged the "common historical narrative which cast indigenous peoples as the passive subjects of colonialism...[and]...depicted the Māori as equally active participants in an event of mutual discovery.":
 Two Worlds: First Meetings Between Maori and Europeans 1642–1772 (1991) – winner of the National Book Award (Non-Fiction) in 1991, and the Ernest Scott Prize in 1992.
 Between Worlds: Early Exchanges Between Maori and Europeans 1773–1815 (1997) – winner of the Ernest Scott Prize in 1998.

Afterwards, she began to explore early exchanges between Pacific Islanders and European explorers in the Pacific, leading to the publication of three books:
 The Trial of the Cannibal Dog: The Remarkable Story of Captain Cook’s Encounters in the South Seas (2003) – winner of the history category and the Montana Medal for Non-Fiction at the 2004 Montana New Zealand Book Awards. Reviewed by the Yale University Press, the book was said to focus on how the relationships between Cook and Polynesians, which initially promised so much, became hostile, ultimately resulting in his death. The review concluded that Salmond's account showed the lasting impact of the collision between two different worlds.
 Aphrodite's Island: the European Discovery of Tahiti (2010).  In this book, Salmond has been said to have provided insight into Tahitian society in the 18th century that set the voyages of Cook and others into a context of complicated relationships with Europeans, but created a narrative of Tahitians as active participants in these interactions. Another reviewer said the book offered well-researched explanations for the clashes that often occurred due to ignorance or lack of respect by Europeans to Tahitian values and traditions.
 Bligh: William Bligh in the South Seas (2011). The New Zealand Herald, in its review of the book, said that Salmond challenged the commonly-held portrayals of Bligh as either brutal or the "misunderstood saint of some revisionist accounts" rather, describing him as an excellent seaman and cartographer who perceptively observed different cultures. The review noted that Salmond concluded the mutiny of the Bounty may have been down to poor people skills by Bligh and his temper but was more likely due to having such a small ship and insufficient officers. Another reviewer also concluded that while Salmond closely examined Bligh's conduct and how this may have brought about his downfall, there was an acknowledgement of other factors outside of his control that contributed to the mutiny.

Her book about exchanges between different realities (ontologies) Tears of Rangi: Experiments between Worlds appeared in July 2017. In a prelude to an interview with Salmond, one reviewer noted that the title referred essentially to the "grief and agony of separation", and the book analysed the role of history in creating myths and realities that needed to be reconciled in Aotearoa, New Zealand. Salmond explained that it was about different worlds (ao) - "te ao Māori, te ao Pākehā, te ao tawhito...ways of being, ways of existing, which have assumptions about reality built into them" that can change by people being genuine, taking care of others and acknowledging their ideas as gifts.

In 2018, she presented a six-part history series Artefact, which screened on Māori Television.

Public policy positions
Based on her research and writing, Salmond has frequently commented about cultural interactions in New Zealand. In the Otago Daily Times, in 2019 she stated: "White supremacy is a black strand woven through our history as a nation", but that at the time of early arrivals to Aotearoa there were "ideas of justice and kindness, equality and mutual respect." She later re-examined the narrative around the landing of Captain Cook in New Zealand in October 1769 and noted that while there were clearly casualties inflicted on local Māori that could have been avoided, there was evidence that Cook was not a "white supremacist, contemptuous of Māori and willing to kill them at random." This conclusion was challenged by academics who said that her approach had been too "frugal with the concept of white supremacy", rather than using it as an analytical framework for "understanding colonialism...and the part that individuals play in perpetuating that system." Salmond responded and disputed that the Doctrine of Discovery was uncontested at the time and that prior to leaving, conflicting instructions were given to Cook. One set said he was to show respect to the "Natives of several lands where the Ship may touch...[and]...no European Nation has a right to occupy any part of their country or settle among them without their voluntary consent", and another said he was to be civil to peoples he encountered, but, "with the consent of the natives, to take possession of convenient situations in the country in the name of the King of Great Britain." Salmond noted that in his journal, Cook admitted to an "error of judgement."

Salmond was optimistic in December 2020 that a worldview for New Zealand based on key concepts such as aroha and kaitiakitanga could build relationships not just between people, but also with the living world.
In 2020, when the New Zealand media outlet Stuff apologised for its inequitable treatment of Māori and tikanga Māori, Salmond made the case that under the Treaty of Waitangi, this  was "living up to the Queen's promise of equality and mutual respect for different tikanga, and weaving these together in ways that benefit all New Zealanders."

Salmond speaks and writes widely on environmental challenges, seeking to build understandings of different cultural beliefs about the relationship between people, land, rivers and the ocean. She was elected Deputy Chair of the Parks and Wilderness Trust in 1990, and in 2000, with her husband Jeremy, initiated the restoration of what would become the Waikereru Ecosanctuary near Gisborne. She has been involved in a number of environmental organisations and is the 'Patron of Te Awaroa: 1000 Rivers', a project that aims to "restore 1000 [New Zealand] rivers by 2050." An article co-authored by Salmond in 2019, said that protecting waterways in New Zealand was about "[exploring] deep underlying assumptions about relationships between people and the planet, and how these translate into very different ways of relating to waterways in Aotearoa New Zealand."

Honours and awards

In the 1988 Queen's Birthday Honours, Salmond was appointed a Commander of the Order of the British Empire, for services to literature and the Māori people, and in 1990 was elected a Fellow of the Royal Society of New Zealand. In the 1995 New Year Honours, she was promoted to Dame Commander of the Order of the British Empire, for services to historical research.

In 2004, Salmond received the Prime Minister's Award for Literary Achievement for non-fiction.

In November 2007, she was elected as an inaugural Fellow of the New Zealand Academy for the Humanities.

In 2008, she was elected a Corresponding Fellow of the British Academy, and in 2009, a Foreign Associate of the National Academy of Sciences – the first New Zealander known to have achieved this double distinction.

In 2013, the Royal Society of New Zealand awarded her the Rutherford Medal. She was also named New Zealander of the Year for her work on cultural history.

In 2015, she was elected an international member of the American Philosophical Society.

In 2017, Salmond was selected as one of the Royal Society Te Apārangi's "150 women in 150 words", celebrating the contributions of women to knowledge in New Zealand.

In 2018, she was awarded a Carl Friedrich von Siemens Research Award, Alexander von Humboldt Foundation, Germany, in recognition of lifetime achievements in research; and was a finalist for the Al-Rodhan prize for Global Cultural Understanding, British Academy, for Tears of Rangi.

In 2020, during the annual Blake Awards ceremony in Auckland, Salmond received the Blake medal in recognition of her work to build intercultural understanding between Māori and Pākehā.  James Gibson, CEO said that "Dame Anne Salmond is one of New Zealand's most outstanding leaders and trail-blazers...[and]...her life-long study of Māori culture, and her efforts to improve intercultural understanding between Māori and Pākehā has improved New Zealanders' understanding of their own history." In the 2021 New Year Honours, Salmond was appointed to the Order of New Zealand for services to New Zealand.

References

External links
 Anne Salmond entry at New Zealand Book Council website
 Profile on British Academy website
Interview with Prof. Alan Macfarlane, Cambridge University:https://sms.cam.ac.uk/media/1130176

1945 births
Living people
Writers from Wellington City
People educated at Solway College
University of Auckland alumni
University of Pennsylvania alumni
New Zealand women historians
New Zealand anthropologists
New Zealand women anthropologists
20th-century New Zealand historians
New Zealand Dames Commander of the Order of the British Empire
Foreign associates of the National Academy of Sciences
Fellows of the Royal Society of New Zealand
Corresponding Fellows of the British Academy
Recipients of the Rutherford Medal
21st-century New Zealand historians
Members of the Order of New Zealand
Cleveland Heights High School alumni
Academic staff of the University of Auckland
Anne